Timon Oyebami (born 12 July 1943) is a Nigerian sprinter. He competed in the 4 × 100 metres relay at the 1968 Summer Olympics and the 1972 Summer Olympics. Oyebami won a bronze medal in the 4 x 100 metres relay at the 1974 British Commonwealth Games.

References

1943 births
Living people
Athletes (track and field) at the 1968 Summer Olympics
Athletes (track and field) at the 1972 Summer Olympics
Nigerian male sprinters
Olympic athletes of Nigeria
Commonwealth Games bronze medallists for Nigeria
Commonwealth Games medallists in athletics
Athletes (track and field) at the 1970 British Commonwealth Games
Athletes (track and field) at the 1974 British Commonwealth Games
Place of birth missing (living people)
Medallists at the 1974 British Commonwealth Games